is a Japanese photographer.

References
Nihon shashinka jiten / 328 Outstanding Japanese Photographers. Kyoto: Tankōsha, 2000. .  English language title; Japanese text.

Japanese photographers
1945 births
Living people
Place of birth missing (living people)
20th-century Japanese photographers